LandlordZONE is a UK-based organisation running the UK's largest online landlord property website.

The organisation provides comment, insight and reference to parliament and local government, Centre for Policy Studies and leading news publications as well as publishing news, legal information, documents and management guides for landlords, agents and property professionals involved in renting out property – novices and experienced alike.

The website provides a very busy forum advising a large landlord and agent community on rental property management issues.

History 
The organisation was founded in 1999 by Tom Entwistle, a residential and commercial landlord with over 40 years experience of the industry. Tom, who holds a master's degree in Management Science from UMIST/MBS, a Post Graduate Diploma in Marketing from the Chartered Institute of Marketing and is a Fellow of the Royal Society of Arts, also has a 26-year background in education - lecturing and management.

In 2002 it was incorporated under the holding company Parkmatic Publications Ltd

In 2016 the organisation acquired distinctiveness on the trademark LandlordZONE

Operation 
LandlordZONE is a for profit organisation which makes money operating as a media agency; it advises clients on their advertising requirements, constructing marketing campaigns to reach a large bespoke audience of rental property landlords, agents and property professionals.

See also
Property portal
RICS

See also
Ground rent
Marriage Value
House in multiple occupation
National Student Housing Survey
Calendar (New Style) Act 1750

References

External links

LandlordZONE Forums

Real estate companies established in 1999
Property services companies of the United Kingdom
British real estate websites
British companies established in 1999